Night Drive may refer to:

Books
"Night Drive", a 1969 poem by Seamus Heaney from the collection Door into the Dark
Night Drive, a 1984 comic book by Richard Sala
Night Drive, a short story by Joe R. Lansdale from The Good, the Bad, and the Indifferent

Film and TV
 Night Drive, a 1977 television film directed by E.W. Swackhamer with Valerie Harper
 Night Drive, a 2011 South African suspense film
 Night Drive (film), a 2022 Indian Malayalam road thriller film
 Night Drive, a 1952 episode of the US TV series Suspense with Robert H. Harris

Music
 Night Drive (album), a 2007 album by Chromatics
 Night Drive, a 1996 album by Garnet Rogers

Songs
 "Night Drive", an instrumental by Giorgio Moroder from the soundtrack American Gigolo
 "Night Drive", a song by Juan Atkins, as Model 500, 1985
 "Night Drive", a song by Jimmy Eat World from Futures
 "Night Drive", a song by The All-American Rejects from Move Along
 "Night Drive", a song by No Devotion from Permanence
 "Night Drive", a song by Norman Brown from Just Chillin' 2002
 "Night Drive", a song by Earl Klugh from Low Ride
 "Night Drive", a track from Romper Stomper soundtrack
 "Night Drive", a song by Ari Lennox from Pho (EP) 2016
 "Night Drive", a song by Brother Firetribe from Feel the Burn

See also

 Night Driver (disambiguation)
 
 Night (disambiguation)
 Drive (disambiguation)
 Drive Knight, a One-Punch Man character